Xenopholis scalaris is a species of snake in the family Colubridae. The species is endemic to South America.

Geographic range
Xenopholis scalaris is found in Amazonian Bolivia, Brazil, Ecuador, and Peru. Other locality records include Colombia, French Guiana, and Venezuela.

References

Further reading
Wucherer, "Otho" (1861). "Description of a New Species of Elapomorphus from Brazil". Ann. Mag. Nat. Hist., Third Series 9: 318–319. (Elapomorphus scalaris, new species).

External links

Reptiles described in 1861
Colubrids
Snakes of South America
Reptiles of Brazil
Reptiles of Peru
Reptiles of Venezuela
Reptiles of Colombia